The Mostra internazionale del film di fantascienza e del fantastico (English: International Science Fiction and Fantasy Film Show), commonly known as Fantafestival, is a film festival devoted to science fiction, fantasy and horror film that has been held annually in Italy since 1981.

Fantafestival takes place every year in the first part of summer in Rome. In the past years, while maintaining its headquarters in Rome, some editions were held in contemporary in different Italian cities like Milan, Naples, Genoa, Verona, Parma and Ravenna.

It was established in 1981 by Alberto Ravaglioli, supported since 1983 by Adriano Pintaldi, who left in 2015; since 2019 the festival is directed by Michele De Angelis and Simone Starace.  For more than 30 years, Fantafestival has been one of the leading Italian events specialized in fantastic films and one of the most important international events of this kind. It has presented and launched in Italy many filmmakers who later would become among the most popular in the fantastic film world. The list of guests of honor includes all the biggest names in the genre, from actors such as Vincent Price, Christopher Lee, Peter Cushing, John Carradine, Rutger Hauer, Robert Englund, to directors and producers like Roger Corman, Freddie Francis, George A. Romero, Alejandro Jodorowsky, Sam Raimi, Peter Jackson, and among Italians, Lucio Fulci, Riccardo Freda, Dario Argento and Lamberto Bava.

The festival is a founding and affiliated member of the European Fantastic Film Festivals Federation.

Awards 

1981
 Best film: Somewhere in Time, directed by Jeannot Szwarc
 Best actor: Christopher Reeve – Somewhere in Time
 Best actress: Lily Tomlin – The Incredible Shrinking Woman
 Best cinematography: Edward Scaife – The Water Babies
 Best special effects: Scared to Death
 Best thriller: Lady Stay Dead, directed by Terry Bourke
 Audience award: The Monster Club, directed by Roy Ward Baker
1982
 Best film: Malevil, directed by Christian de Chalonge; Schlock, directed by John Landis
 Best director: Olle Hellbom – The Brothers Lionheart
 Best actor: George C. Scott – The Changeling
 Best actress: Bella Tanay – The Fortress
 Best special effects: Inseminoid
 Best Children's Film: Chronopolis, directed by Piotr Kamler; Les Maîtres du temps, directed by René Laloux, Jean Giraud
1983
 Best film: Panik, directed by Sándor Reisenbüchler
 Best director: King Hu – Da lunhui
 Best actor: Oliver Reed – Dr. Heckyl and Mr. Hype
 Best screenplay: William Dear and Michael Nesmith – Timerider: The Adventure of Lyle Swann
 Best cinematography: Louis Horvath – Strange Invaders
1984
 Best film: The Dead Zone, directed by David Cronenberg
 Best screenplay: Nico Mastorakis e Fred Perry – Blind Date; Stephen Carpenter, Jeffrey Obrow – The Power
 Best special effects: Tempesta metallica
 Audience award: The Dead Zone, directed by David Cronenberg
 Special award: Quest, directed by Elaine and Saul Bass
1985
 Best film: Philadelphia Experiment, directed by Stewart Raffill
 Best short film: Nausicaä of the Valley of the Wind, directed by Hayao Miyazaki
 Special mention: The Company of Wolves, directed by Neil Jordan
 Seleco award: Giovanotti Mondani Meccanici
 Special award "FantaItaly": Dario Argento – Lamberto Bava – Pupi Avati
1986
 Best film: Re-Animator, directed Stuart Gordon
 Best director: Geoff Murphy – The Quiet Earth
 Best actor: Bruno Lawrence – The Quiet Earth
 Best actress: Alexandra Stewart – Peau dange
 Best special effects: Re-Animator
 Best short film: L'ultimo regalo del XX secolo, directed by Massimo Russo
 Best video: Biancaneve, directed by Francesco Abbondati
 Special award: Miguel Bosé – The Knight of the Dragon
 Career award: Val Guest e Michael Carreras
1987
 Best film: Mannequin, directed by Michael Gottlieb
 Best director: Michael Gottlieb – Mannequin
 Best actor: Andrew McCarthy – Mannequin
 Best actress: Yvonne De Carlo – American Gothic
 Best special effects: Dolls
 Best first work: La Casa del Buon Ritorno, directed by Beppe Cino
1988
 Best film: The Navigator: A Medieval Odyssey, directed by Vincent Ward
 Best director: Ching Siu-tung – A Chinese Ghost Story
 Best actor: Nique Needles – As Time Goes By
 Best actress: Mária Varga – A Hungarian Fairy Tale
 Best special effects: Il giorno della crisalide
1989
 Best film: Tetsuo: The Iron Man, directed by Shinya Tsukamoto
 Best director: Ryu Kaneda – Mangetsu no Kuchizuke
 Best actor: Randy Quaid, Bryan Madorsky – Parents
 Best actress: Eri Fukatsu – Mangetsu no kuchizuke
 Best special effects: The Lair of the White Worm
 Special mention: The Dreaming, directed by Mario Andreacchio
 Audience award: Bad Taste, directed by Peter Jackson
 Career award: Alejandro Jodorowsky
1990
 Best film: Un minuto a mezzanotte, directed by René Manzor
 Best director: René Manzor – Un minuto a mezzanotte
 Best actor: Klaus Maria Brandauer – L'orologiaio
 Best actress: Elena Lokvleva – Lestniza
1991
 Best film: Adrenaline, directed by Renée and Marc Caro
 Best director: Peter Jackson – Meet the Feebles
 Best actor: Lance Henriksen – The Pit and the Pendulum
 Best actress: Heidi (The hippopotamus of the film) – Meet the Feebles
 Best special effects: Meet the Feebles
 Special award: Il gioco delle ombre, directed by Stefano Gabrini – Notte profonda, directed by Fabio Salerno
1992
 Best film: Sleepwalkers, directed by Mick Garris
 Best director: Mick Garris – Sleepwalkers
 Best actor: Tim Balme – Braindead 
 Best actress: Alice Krige – Sleepwalkers
 Best screenplay: Stephen King – Sleepwalkers
 Best special effects: Braindead
1993
 Best film: The Dark Half, directed by George A. Romero
 Best director: Brian Henson – The Muppet Christmas Carol
 Best actor: Timothy Hutton – The Dark Half
 Best actress: Nadia Cameron-Blakey – Merlin
 Best screenplay: Paul Hunt and Nick McCarthy – The Dark Half
 Best special effects: Xiao ao jiang hu: Dong Fang Bu Bai
 Special Jury prize: FernGully: The Last Rainforest, directed by Bill Kroyer
 Career award: George A. Romero and Christopher Lee
1994
 Best film: The Bride with White Hair, directed by Ronny Yu
 Best director: Jaroslav Brabec – Krvavý román
 Best actor: The creatures of the film – Freaked
 Best special effects: H.P. Lovecraft's: Necronomicon
 Special award: Dark Waters, directed by Mariano Baino
 Career award: Freddie Francis
1995
 Best film: Nightwatch, directed by Ole Bornedal
 Best director: Guillermo del Toro – Cronos
 Best actor: Robert Englund – The Mangler
 Best actress: Rikke Louise Andersson – Nightwatch
 Best special effects: Death Machine
 Best independent film: Shatter Dead, directed by Scooter McCrae
 Audience award: The Roly Poly Man, directed by Bill Young
 Career award: Ennio Morricone
1996
 Best film: Taxandria, directed by Raoul Servais
 Best director: Óscar Aibar – Atolladero
 Best actor: Doug Bradley – Hellraiser: Bloodline
 Best actress: Whoopi Goldberg – Theodore Rex
 Best special effects: Anthony C. Ferrante – The Dentist
 Lucio Fulci award: Fatal frames: Fotogrammi mortali, directed by Al Festa
 Career award: Riccardo Freda
 Special mention for the Poetic Technology: Mécanomagie, directed by Bady Minck
1997
 Best film: Tromeo and Juliet, directed by Lloyd Kaufman
 Best director: La lengua asesina, directed by Alberto Sciamma
 Best actor: Paolo Rotondo – The Ugly
 Best actress: Isabelle Cyr – Karmina
 Best special effects: Body Troopers
1998
 Best film: Perdita Durango, directed by Álex de la Iglesia
 Best director: Stuart Gordon – The Wonderful Ice Cream Suit
 Best actor: Stuart Townsend – Resurrection Man
 Best actress: Rosie Perez – Perdita Durango
 Best special effects: Shadow Builder
 Best soundtrack: Stefano Mainetti – Tale of the Mummy
 Special Jury prize: to the best production: Daniel Sladek and Silvio Muraglia – Tale of the Mummy
 Special award: Zhi ji sha ren fan, directed by Stephan Yip
 Career award: William Lustig
1999
 Best film: Urban Ghost Story, directed by Geneviève Jolliffe
 Best director: Agustí Villaronga – 99.9
 Best actor: Lars Bom – Skyggen
 Best actress: Heather Ann Foster – Urban Ghost Story
 Best special effects: Skyggen
 Special Jury prize: Kiss My Blood, regia di David Jazay
2000
 Best film: Nameless, directed by Jaume Balagueró
 Best director: Anders Rønnow Klarlund – Besat
 Best actor: Lazar Ristovski – Zbogum na dvaesetiot vek
 Best actress: Jennifer Tilly – Bride of Chucky
 Best special effects: Bride of Chucky
 Special Jury prize: Lighthouse, directed by Simon Hunter
 Audience award: The Convent, directed by Mike Mendez
2001
 Best film: Faust: Love of the Damned, directed by Brian Yuzna
 Best director: Ryuhei Kitamura – Versus
 Best actor: Steve Railsback – In the Light of the Moon
 Best actress: Sally Champlin – In the Light of the Moon
 Best special effects: Faust: Love of the Damned
 Audience award: Faust: Love of the Damned, directed by Brian Yuzna
 Lucio Fulci Award: Pure Blood, directed by Ken Kaplan
2002
 Best film: The Inside Story, directed by Robert Sutherland
 Best director: Robert Sutherland – The Inside Story
 Best actor: Vincent Gallo – Stranded: Náufragos
 Best actress: Maria De Medeiros – Stranded: Náufragos
 Best special effects: Ichi The Killer
2003
 Best film: FeardotCom, directed by William Malone
 Best short film: Space Off, directed by Tino Franco
 Migliori effetti speciali: Red Riding Hood
2004
 Best film: Evilenko, directed by David Grieco
2010
 Special Award: The Museum of Wonders, directed by Domiziano Cristopharo
2012
 Golden Bat for Best Film: The Hounds, directed by Roberto and Maurizio Del Piccolo
 Golden Bat for Best Short Film: The Story of a Mother, directed by Alessandro de Vivo and Ivano Di Natale 
2013
 Golden Bat for Best Film: Errors of the Human Body, directed by Eron Sheean 
 Golden Bat for Best Short Film: Fist of Jesus, directed by Adrián Cardona e David Muñoz
 Golden Bat for Best Italian Film: P.O.E. – Project Of Evil, directed by Angelo Capasso, Giuseppe Capasso, Domiziano Cristopharo, Donatello Della Pepa, Giuliano Giacomelli, Remy Ginestet, Nathan Nicholovitch, Edo Tagliavini and Alberto Viavattene
 Golden Bat for Best Italian Short Film: Bios, directed by Grazia Tricarico
2014
 Golden Bat for Best Film: Timelapse, directed by Bradley King 
 Golden Bat for Best Short Film: Happy Together, directed by Iossif Melamed
 Golden Bat for Best Italian Film: Oltre il Guado, directed by Lorenzo Bianchini
 Golden Bat for Best Italian Short Film: Lievito Madre, directed by Fulvio Risuleo
 Mario Bava Award: The Perfect Husband, directed by Lucas Pavetto
 Mary Shelley Award: Soulmate, directed by Axelle Carolyn
2015
 Golden Bat for Best Film: Landmine Goes Click, directed by Levan Bakhia 
 Golden Bat for Best Short Film: The Mill at Calder's End, directed by Kevin McTurk
 Golden Bat for Best Italian Film: Index Zero, directed by Lorenzo Sportiello
 Golden Bat for Best Italian Short Film: Memories, directed by Vincenzo Alfieri
 Mario Bava Award: Fantasticherie di un passeggiatore solitario, directed by Paolo Gaudio
2016
 Golden Bat for Best Film: Testigo Íntimo, directed by Santiago Fernández Calvete 
 Golden Bat for Best Short Film: First Like, directed by Alexander Rönnberg
 Golden Bat for Best Italian Film: My Little Sister, directed by Maurizio and Roberto Del Piccolo
 Golden Bat for Best Italian Short Film: Varicella, directed by Fulvio Risuleo
 Mario Bava Award: not given
2017
 Golden Bat for Best Film: Matar A Dios, directed by Caye Casas and Albert Pintó 
 Golden Bat for Best Short film: Cuerno Oe Hueso, directed by Adrián López
 Golden Bat for Best Italian Film: Almost Dead, directed by Giorgio Bruno
 Golden Bat for Best Italian Short Film: I vampiri sognano le fate d’inverno?, directed by Claudio Chiaverotti
 Mario Bava Award: The Antithesis, directed by Francesco Mirabelli
 Career award: Luigi Cozzi
 Career award: Biagio Proietti
2018
 Golden Bat for Best Film: Framed, directed by Marc Martínez Jordán
 Golden Bat for Best Short film: The Essence of Everything, directed by Daniele Barbiero
 Mario Bava Award Film: Go home – A casa loro, directed by Luna Gualano
 Mario Bava Award Short Film: Insetti, directed by Gianluca Manzetti
 Audience Award: Nevermind, directed by Eros Puglielli
2019
 Golden Bat for Best Film: Werewolf, directed by Adrian Panek
 Silver Bat for Best Short film: The Nix, directed by Nicolai G.H. Johansen
 Silver Bat for Italian Best Short film: Aria, directed by Brando De Sica
 Career Award: Pupi Avati
 Career Award: Jack Sholder
 Career Award: Christina Lindberg
 Career Award: Eckhart Schmidt
 Career Award: Robert Sigl
 Career Award: Mariano Baino
 Career Award: Coralina Cataldi-Tassoni
2020
 Golden Bat for Best Film: Tezuka's Barbara, directed by Macoto Tezka
 Silver Bat for Best Short film: The Appointment, directed by Alexandre Singh
2021
 Golden Bat for Best Film: Beyond the Infinite Two Minutes, directed by Junta Yamaguchi
 Silver Bat for Best Short film: They're Here, directed by Sid Zanforlin
 Silver Bat for Italian Best Short film: The Recycling Man, directed by Carlo Ballauri
 Career Award: Gianni Romoli
2022
 Golden Bat for Best Film: The Day I Found A Girl In The Trash, directed by Michal Krzywicki
 Silver Bat for Best Short film: The Tenant, directed by Lucas Paulino and Ángel Torre
 Silver Bat for Italian Best Short film: Pluto, directed by Ivan Saudelli

References

External links

Ampia raccolta di informazioni, aneddoti e ritagli di giornale d'epoca

Film festivals in Rome
Fantasy and horror film festivals
Film festivals established in 1981
Science fiction film festivals